Uchanie  is a village in Hrubieszów County, Lublin Voivodeship, in eastern Poland. It is the seat of the gmina (administrative district) called Gmina Uchanie.

Upon the German invasion of Poland in 1939, Uchanie had a population of 1,161 Jews. The Jewish population was sent to nearby Hrubieszów, from where they were sent to the Sobibór extermination camp. The Jewish community then ceased to exist.

References

Uchanie
Kholm Governorate